The Moapa pebblesnail also known as the Muddy Valley turban snail, scientific name Pyrgulopsis avernalis, is a species of small freshwater snail with an operculum, an aquatic gastropod mollusk in the family Hydrobiidae.

The natural habitat of this species is springs, and it is currently threatened by habitat loss. This species is endemic to the Moapa Valley, Nevada, United States and the common name refers to the Moapa River in Nevada.

Description
Its differentiated from other Pyrgulopsis in that its penial filament has a small lobe and large filament with the penial ornament consisting of a small terminal gland, a gland along the outer edge of the penial lobe and a ventral gland.

Genus transfer
When originally described in 1935, it was assigned to the genus Fluminicola.  In 1994, it was transferred to the genus Pyrgulopsis.

References

Pyrgulopsis
Gastropods described in 1935
Molluscs of the United States
Taxonomy articles created by Polbot